The Missouri Western Griffons football program is a college football team that represents Missouri Western State University. The team has had 5 head coaches since organized football began in 1970. The Griffons have played in almost than 500 games in its 45 seasons. In those seasons, one coaches have led the Griffons to postseason play: Jerry Partridge. Partridge is also the only coach to have won conference championships with the Griffons. Partridge is the all-time leader in games coached, years coached, and winning percentage. Harold Coagle is, in terms of winning percentage, the least successful coach the Griffons have had as he has a .276 winning percentage.

Key

Coaches
Statistics correct as of the end of the 2022 NCAA Division II football season

Notes

References

Missouri Western

Missouri sports-related lists